Aisha Sharma (born 25 January 1989) is an Indian actress and model. She was first seen in Ayushmann Khurrana's Ik Vaari music video. Sharma then made her acting debut in the Hindi action thriller Satyamev Jayate (2018) alongside John Abraham and Manoj Bajpayee.

Early life 
Sharma started her career as a model and went on to become a prominent face for many popular brands including Lakme, Pepsi and Campus shoes. In 2016, she was featured as one of the Kingfisher Calendar Girls.

Filmography

Web series

Music Videos

See also
 List of people from Bihar
 List of Indian film actresses
 List of Hindi film actresses

References

External links 

 

Indian actresses
Living people
1989 births
21st-century Indian actresses
Indian film actresses
Actresses in Hindi cinema
Actresses from Bihar
Female models from Bihar
People from Bhagalpur